Jugodisk was a record label was established in 1968, in the then Socialist Republic of Serbia in SFR Yugoslavia in Belgrade, today Serbia.
Before 1981, it was known as Beograd Disk. In 2003, the company was sold at a state auction to the show business manager Nenad Kapor and since then it operates as Jugodisk A.D. (joint stock company).

History
Jugodisk was established in 1968, in the then Socialist Republic of Serbia in SFR Yugoslavia, hence its name is a portmanteau word of Jugoslavija (Yugoslavia) and disk (for a vinyl record).

In 2003, the company was sold at a state auction to the show business manager Nenad Kapor and since then it operates as Jugodisk A.D. (joint stock company)

The label should not be confused with another label named Jugodisk, which was formed in the 1950s and issued 78rpm records with Yugoslav folk and popular music, but soon ended the activity.

Media formats and Distribution

Since 1981, the phonographic production of the newly restructured Jugodisk had been published in two formats ‐ vinyl records and cassette tapes. Since 1992, the company moved from the production of vinyl records over to the production of Compact Disks (CDs).

Artists
The company is notable for signing several prominent former Yugoslav pop and rock artists, as well as several prominent Yugoslav folk artists. Some of the artist that have been signed to Jugodisk, include:

Aleksandar Makedonski
Alisa
Badmingtons
Balkan
Haris Džinović
Griva
Gru
Srđan Marjanović
Radomir Mihajlović Točak
Oktobar 1864
Hanka Paldum

Partibrejkers
Rok Mašina
Sanjalice
Slomljena Stakla
Boba Stefanović
Sunshine
Šaban Šaulić
Tunel
U Škripcu
Hari Varešanović

Like other former Yugoslav labels, Jugodisk was also licensed to release foreign titles for the Yugoslav market which included certain albums and singles by: The Animals, Bad Manners, Shirley Bassey, The Beat, George Benson, Black Sabbath, Johnny Cash, The Fall, Gerry & the Pacemakers, Eddy Grant, Bill Haley & His Comets, Roy Harper, Jimmy Page, The Kinks, Matchbox, The Moody Blues, Willie Nelson, The Alan Parsons Project, Dolly Parton, Wilson Pickett, Iggy Pop, Chris Rea, Stray Cats, Toyah, Wishbone Ash and The Yardbirds.

Competition
Other major labels in the former Socialist Federal Republic of Yugoslavia were: PGP-RTB from Belgrade, Jugoton and Suzy from Zagreb, Diskoton from Sarajevo, ZKP RTVLJ from Ljubljana, Diskos from Aleksandrovac, and others.

References

See also
List of record labels

Yugoslav record labels
Serbian record labels
Serbian rock music
Yugoslav rock music
Record labels established in 1974
State-owned record labels